Al-Ṣaḥīḥ min Sīrat al-Nabī al-A‘ẓam is a collection of 35 books written by Sayyid Jafar Morteza Amili, on the details of life of the Islamic prophet Muhammad. The author started his research on the prophetic biography when he was twenty years old and gradually published his findings through the years. In his books, the author investigates the impact of the ban on hadith and the role of the new converts on the credibility of Islamic history. He further surveys the methods used in the writing of several other siras and describes his own style on the topic. The book won the book of the year prize in Iran in 1993.

References

Biographies of Muhammad
Arab history
20th-century Arabic books
Shia theology books